Reedy Creek Energy Services (RCES) is a wholly owned subsidiary of The Walt Disney Company. It operates the  electric and other utility transmission and distribution systems of the Reedy Creek Improvement District (RCID) on behalf of the district which specifically covers Walt Disney World outside Orlando, Florida. Some power is produced by the district-owned power plant north of the Magic Kingdom with the remainder purchased from the public power grid. Officially the utility systems are owned by the district entity itself and the district "contracts" with RCES to operate the systems. 

In addition to electric power, RCES handles all public services and public works for the RCID including water, natural gas, roadway maintenance, waste and recycling, sewage and wastewater treatment.
 
RCES is currently Disney's only non-entertainment-related subsidiary. Until 2001, Disney and Sprint owned Vista-United Telecommunications, a telephone company that served the RCID. That company has since been sold to Smart City Telecom.

Images

References

External links
 Reedy Creek Improvement District- Utilities

Companies based in Orange County, Florida
Natural gas companies of the United States
Electric power companies of the United States
The Walt Disney Company subsidiaries
Reedy Creek Improvement District